The 2016–17 Algerian Ligue Professionnelle 2 will be the 53rd season of the Algerian Ligue Professionnelle 2 since its establishment, and its fourth season under its current title. A total of 16 teams will contest the league.

Team overview

Stadia and locations

League table

Result table

Season statistics

Top scorers

Hat-tricks

Media coverage

See also
 2016–17 Algerian Ligue Professionnelle 1
 2016–17 Algerian Cup

References

Algerian Ligue 2 seasons
2
Algeria